Sad is the fourth Nels Cline Trio album. The album was recorded at New Zone Studio by Wayne Peet.

Track listing
 "Anthony (In Memory of Tony Williams)"
 "Fluff With Fork"
 "The Luxury of Silk (for Lynn Johnston)"
 "Little Shaver"
 "Arrows (for Carla Bozulich)"
 "Texas Telephone Pal"
 "Where Is Your Woman? (In Memory of Laura Nyro)"
 "In Form (for Carole Kim)"
 "Thought Cloud"
 "Crest In Black (for Rincy and Her Drums)"

Personnel
 Nels Cline - Guitars, Voice (#2)
 Bob Mair - Bass, Guitar (#6)
 Michael Preussner - Drum Set, Organ (#6, #9)
 Noriko Peet - Voice (#3)

Nels Cline Trio albums
1998 albums